Isidro is a given name. Notable people with the name include:

Saints 
Saint Isidore the Laborer (c. 1070 – died 1130), the patron saint of farmers of Madrid (Spain) and La Ceiba (Honduras)
Saint Isidore of Seville (c. 560 – died 636), scholar and Archbishop of Seville

Given name 
Isidro Ancheta (1882–1946), Filipino landscape painter
Isidro Ayora (1879–1978), Ecuadorian politician
Isidro Barradas, Spanish general sent to Mexico in 1829
Isidro de Alaix Fábregas, Count of Vergara and Viscount of Villarrobledo (1790-1853), Spanish general of the First Carlist War
Isidro del Prado (born 1959), Filipino sprinter
Isidro Díaz González (born 1954), Spanish retired professional footballer
Isidro Díaz (footballer, born 1972), Spanish footballer
Isidro Fabela (1882–1964), Mexican judge, politician, professor, writer, publisher and governor of the State of Mexico
Isidro Fabré (1895–?), Cuban baseball pitcher
Isidro García (boxer) (born 1976), Mexican boxer
Isidro Goma y Tomas (1869–1940), Spanish Bishop, Cardinal and Archbishop
Isidro González (1907–?), Spanish fencer
Isidro Gutiérrez (born 1989), Salvadoran footballer
Isidro A. Negrón Irizarry (born 1956), Puerto Rican politician
Isidro Lángara (1912—1992), Spanish footballer
Isidro Márquez (born 1965), Mexican Major League Baseball pitcher
Isidro Montoya (born 1990), Colombian sprinter
Isidro Mosquea (born 1976), boxer from the Dominican Republic
Isidro Nozal (born 1977), former Spanish professional road racing cyclist
Isidro Pedraza Chávez (born 1959), Mexican politician
Isidro Rico (born 1961), Mexican marathon runner
Isidro Salusky, American nephrologist
Isidro Ungab (born 1961), Filipino politician

See also
San Isidro
St. Isidore (disambiguation)

Spanish masculine given names